The Women's individual compound W1 archery discipline at the 2016 Summer Paralympics was contested  from September 10 to September 17. Ranking rounds took place on 10 September, while knockout rounds continued on September 17.

In the ranking rounds each archer shot 72 arrows, and was seeded according to score. In the knock-out stages each archer shot three arrows per set against an opponent, with scores aggregated. Matches were won by highest aggregate score. Losing semifinalists competed in a bronze medal match.

In the Women's individual compound W1 discipline, the two lowest ranked archers after the ranking round played each other in a preliminary knockout match, before joining the remaining seven archers in the quarterfinal round.

Ranking Round

The ranking round took place on September 10, 2016. The ranking was headed by Great Britain's Jessica Stretton, setting a new Paralympic record for the event. France's Elisabeth Barleon and Czech Republic's Sarka Musilova were placed in the preliminary round as the lowest two finishers on rankings.

 PR = Paralympic Record.

Knockout stage

References

M
Para